Sonbarsa  is a village development committee in Parsa District in the Narayani Zone of southern Nepal.

Demographics
At the time of the 2011 Nepal census it had a population of 7,158 people living in 1114 individual households. There were 3,664 males and 3,494 females at the time of census.

References

Populated places in Parsa District